Gran Turismo 7 is a racing simulation video game developed by Polyphony Digital and published by Sony Interactive Entertainment. The game is the eighth mainline installment in the Gran Turismo series. The game was announced on June 11, 2020, at the PlayStation 5 reveal event and was released on March 4, 2022 for PlayStation 4 and PlayStation 5, making it the first multi-console installment in the series. The game also features virtual reality support compatible with PlayStation VR2 through a free in-game update.

Gameplay 
Gran Turismo 7 features the return of the single player campaign, GT Simulation Mode. Other returning features are the return of traditional racing tracks and vehicles, Special Events, Championships, Driving School, Tuning Parts Shop, Used Cars dealership, and GT Auto while still retaining the new GT Sport Mode, Brand Central, and Discover that were introduced in Gran Turismo Sport. The player needs to progress through tasks ("Menu Books") from the GT Cafe to unlock features like multiplayer, and all tracks and cars.

The game also features the return of dynamic time and weather effects, which previously appeared in Gran Turismo 5 and Gran Turismo 6. Despite the game including a single player campaign, like with Gran Turismo Sport, the game requires a constant internet connection in order for players to be able to save their progress. The series creator Kazunori Yamauchi explains that this decision was made to prevent hacking and cheating. Arcade mode, however, is fully playable offline.

For the PlayStation 5 version, the game takes advantage of the console's increased processing power, dedicated ray-tracing hardware, custom solid-state drive storage, Tempest Engine, and DualSense controller to support features such as advanced haptic feedback, adaptive triggers, real-time ray tracing effects, 3D spatial audio, and reduced loading times. The PlayStation 5 version of Gran Turismo 7 also runs at 4K resolution and 60 frames per second with support for high dynamic range.

In addition, drivers from Gran Turismos eSports competition, the Gran Turismo World Series (previously the FIA-Certified Gran Turismo Championships utilizing Gran Turismo Sport), appear as AI opponents and License Test coaches.

Development and release 
In a July 2019 interview with GTPlanet, a fan website dedicated to the Gran Turismo series, Yamauchi stated that the next Gran Turismo title is in active development. Yamauchi confirmed that there will be a focus on fine tuning the classic GT experience, adding: "I think the next title that we’re going to create will be a combination of the past, present and future – a complete form of Gran Turismo."

Gran Turismo 7 was revealed at Sony's PlayStation 5 reveal stream on June 11, 2020. The game is being developed by Polyphony Digital and published by Sony Interactive Entertainment for the PlayStation 4 and the PlayStation 5. tri-Crescendo contributed to development by assisting with background models. The game was initially scheduled for a release in 2021. It was later delayed to 2022 due to the impact of the COVID-19 pandemic on the video game industry affecting game development. The game was released for PS4 and PS5 consoles on March 4, 2022. Seven time F1 world driver's champion, Lewis Hamilton, reprises his role as the "maestro" of the series from Gran Turismo Sport.

On the day of the game's release, Gran Turismo 7 was removed from sale in Russia, although Sony had not made a formal decision at the time. On March 9, four days after its release, PlayStation announced that it would halt sales of its games, including Gran Turismo 7, in Russia in response to the 2022 Russian invasion of Ukraine.

On March 7, Columbia Records and Sony Interactive Entertainment released a soundtrack album titled Find Your Line (Official Music from Gran Turismo 7). The album features songs inspired by the game recorded by a lineup of artists, including GoldLink, Bring Me the Horizon, Nothing but Thieves, Idris Elba, Major Lazer, Rosalía, Lil Tjay, and Jawsh 685.

In June, the FIA announced it had chosen Assetto Corsa Competizione as its platform for the 2022 Motorsport Games after mutually agreeing with Polyphony to temporarily suspend their partnership until the GT7 platform becomes more stable.

The 1.29 update was released on February 20, 2023, which included the PS VR2 upgrade, and a time-limited events that will offer a glimpse of the new AI "Sophy". The new AI will adapt to the level of the player and will use advanced techniques, like drafting.

Reception

Critical response 
Gran Turismo 7 received "generally favorable" reviews according to review aggregator Metacritic.

While disliking the monetization, Ars Technica praised the implementation of license tests, "Polyphony has struck a good balance here. The threshold for achieving a bronze finish in each test is relatively easy to reach, but getting all golds might be a time-consuming and frustrating experience, depending on your skill". 

The Verge liked the title's DualSense features, writing "it's the best showcase for the DualSense I’ve yet to see. The vibrations in the controller do a convincing job of simulating various surfaces, conditions, and degrees of traction... You can even feel the pressure release in anti-lock brake systems". Eurogamer enjoyed the GT Cafe, singling out the characters as a memorable part of it, "Of all the many twists and turns... the visual novel might well be the most surprising yet. What's perhaps more surprising is Gran Turismo 7 lands it remarkably well, giving its campaign an oddball character all of its own". 

Polygon felt the visuals were "cutting edge", but criticized how long it took to unlock cars, "The rate at which you earn credits feels slow, with many desirable cars remaining out of reach long into the game... Just keeping up with the entry requirements of events can necessitate going off-piste to grind for credits". Destructoid liked the amount of ways that were available to tackle courses, feeling it added more variety to the game, "You can do a classic reverse racing situation, as well as dabble in parts of the track... take on time trials, free play lobbies (where you can just drive around and chill), arcade mode, and events".

Game Informer praised the feel of driving, especially the handling of terrain, "elevation changes, weather, driving surface, road bank, vehicle downforce, and countless other factors seamlessly contribute to whether you successfully carry your momentum into a turn or spin out into the grass". GamesRadar+ enjoyed the amount of content available, calling it "an absolutely gargantuan game", but criticized the performance, noting hitches and occasional crashes. IGN felt Gran Turismo 7 recreated the spirit of prior entries, but felt the car selection was comparatively limited compared to competitors like Forza: "With a few exceptions, most manufacturers’ ranges tend to top out at around 2017. If you're expecting to see quite a few high-profile cars from the last two or three years here, like the latest McLarens or any Tesla built since 2012, you may be disappointed".

Hands-on of the Gran Turismo 7 VR support on the PS VR2 was overwhelmingly positive, with one editor describing it as "the best console virtual reality experience to date".

Audience response 
Gran Turismo 7 was the subject of review bombing on Metacritic two weeks after release, following changes made to the game through updates. It received the lowest Metacritic user rating for a game published by Sony. Criticism focused on its "aggressive" use of microtransactions and the focus on grinding to unlock in-game currency and content. Players noted that updates to the game increased the time needed to grind, as well as reducing the amount of rewards gained, feeling it encouraged spending real-world money on microtransactions. The pricing of items was labelled by some as being too expensive, noting certain cars could cost as much as US$200. The game's 1.07 version update led to an outage that lasted 30 hours as a result of server maintenance; the always-online requirement meant players were limited to the game's offline modes.

During the first month of release, Polyphony president Kazunori Yamauchi wrote that while he wished for players to enjoy content without microtransactions, he felt it important that cars reflected the prices of their real-world counterparts to "convey their value and rarity". His statement drew some criticism. Several days later, Yamauchi apologized for the outage and the changes made to the in-game economy, and announced Polyphony would implement a series of updates from April 2022 to make progression fairer. As compensation, all players who had bought the game before March 25 would receive one million credits—the equivalent of US$10—of in-game currency, available until the following month.

Sales 
In Japan, it launched with 139,964 physical units sold in its first week, making it the best-selling game of the week. It sold over 190,000 physical units in Japan during its launch month, making it the second best-selling game of the month in the country (below Kirby and the Forgotten Land).

In the United States, it set a franchise record with the highest-grossing launch month sales for a Gran Turismo title, despite ranking number two in its debut month (second only to Elden Ring).

In the United Kingdom, Gran Turismo 7 was the best-selling game in its first week of release, and remained number one the following week. It reached number 1 in Switzerland. In Germany, more than 200,000 copies of the game had been sold by the end of March 2022. By the end of January 2023, more than 400,000 copies of the game had been sold in Germany.

Based on the sales figures that were released during the 25th anniversary of the Gran Turismo series, it is estimated that the game has sold 5–6 millions as of November 16, 2022.

Awards

Notes

References

External links 
 

2022 video games
D.I.C.E. Award for Racing Game of the Year winners
Gran Turismo (series)
Multiplayer and single-player video games
PlayStation 4 games
PlayStation 5 games
PlayStation VR2 games
Racing simulators
Sony Interactive Entertainment games
Video game sequels
Video games developed in Japan
Video games postponed due to the COVID-19 pandemic
Video games set in Arizona
Video games set in Australia
Video games set in Austria
Video games set in Belgium
Video games set in Brazil
Video games set in California
Video games set in Colorado
Video games set in Croatia
Video games set in Daytona Beach, Florida
Video games set in England
Video games set in France
Video games set in Georgia (U.S. state)
Video games set in Germany
Video games set in Italy
Video games set in Kent
Video games set in Kyoto
Video games set in Nevada
Video games set in New York (state)
Video games set in Spain
Video games set in Switzerland
Video games set in Texas
Video games set in Tokyo